With more than 500 films made in Lebanon, this is an incomplete list of Lebanese films in year order. For an A-Z list of films currently on Wikipedia, see :Category:Lebanese films.

1920s

1930s

1940s

1950s

1960s

1970s

1980s

1990s

2000s

2010s

2020s

See also
Cinema of Lebanon 
 List of Lebanese Television Series
 List of Lebanese submissions for the Academy Award for Best Foreign Language Film

References

External links
 Lebanese film at the Internet Movie Database
 Lebanese Box office at the Box Office Mojo

Lebanon

Films